Chetri Chandra (Moon of Chaitra) is a festival that marks the beginning of the Lunar Hindu New Year for Sindhi Hindus. The date of the festival is based on the lunar cycle of the lunisolar Hindu calendar, falling on the first day of the year, in the Sindhi month of Chet (Chaitra). It typically falls in late March or early April in the Gregorian calendar on or about the same day as Gudi Padwa in Maharashtra and Ugadi in other parts of the Deccan region of India.

Overview 
The festival marks the arrival of spring and harvest, but in the Sindhi community, it also marks the birth of Uderolal in 1007, after they prayed to the Hindu god Varun Dev on the banks of River Indus to save them from the persecution by the tyrannical Muslim ruler Mirkhshah. Varun Dev morphed into a warrior and old man who preached and reprimanded Mirkhshah that Muslims and Hindus deserve the same religious freedoms. He, as Jhulelal, became the champion of the people in Sindh, from both religions. Among his Sufi Muslim followers, Jhulelal is known as "Khwaja Khizir" or "Zindapir". The Hindu Sindhi, according to this legend, celebrate the new year as Uderolal's birthday.

The tradition likely started with Daryapanthis. During the British colonial rule era, major annual fairs (melas) used to be held in Uderolal and Zindapir (near Hyderabad, Pakistan). In contemporary times, the Sindhi community celebrates the festival of Cheti Chand with major fairs, feast parties, processions with jhankis (glimpse stage) of Jhulelal (an avatar of [Varun dev], similar to Vithoba), other Hindu deities, and social dancing.

On this day, many Sindhis take Baharana Sahib, a representation of Jhulelal, to a nearby river or lake. Baharana Sahib consists of jyot (oil lamp), misiri (crystal sugar), fota (cardamom), fal (fruits), and akha. Behind is kalash (water jar) and a nariyal (coconut) in it, covered with cloth, phool (flowers) and patta (leaves). There is also a Murti (statue) of Pujya Jhulelal Devta. Cheti Chand is a major festival of Sindhi Hindus in India and Pakistan, and also celebrated by the Hindu Sindhi diaspora around the world.

References

External links
 Images of Cheti Chand in Sindhunagar from Sindhunagar.com
 Recipe to make Tairi (an authentic Sindhi delicacy or Sweet Rice made on occasion of Chetichand)  from sindhirasoi.com

Hindu festivals
New Year celebrations
New Year in India
New Year in Pakistan
Sindhi culture
Hinduism in Sindh
March observances
April observances
Hindu festivals in India
Religious festivals in India
Religious festivals in Pakistan